José Irving Santana São Paulo (October 26, 1964 – August 10, 2006) was a Brazilian actor.

Born in Feira de Santana, Bahia, Irving São Paulo was the son of Brazilian director Olney São Paulo. He had been active in both television and films since the late 1970s.

He was diagnosed with necrotizing pancreatitis and hospitalized in the Copa D'Or hospital in Rio de Janeiro, Brazil on July 31, 2006. He died from multiple organ failure in Rio de Janeiro on August 10, 2006 at the age of 41. Left two sons, Johann Irving Luporini São Paulo (02/10/1983) and Luiz Henrique de Magalhães Dias Coelho São Paulo (02/05/1985). His brother Ilya São Paulo was also an actor.

Filmography
 Torre de Babel (1998)
 A Viagem (1994)
 Mulheres de Areia (1993)
 Perigosas Peruas (1992)
 A História de Ana Raio e Zé Trovão (1990)
 Champagne (1983)
 Final Feliz (1982)
 Bebê a Bordo (1988)
 A Muralha (2000) - TV mini-series
 Um Só Coração (2004)
 Você Decide
 O Veneno da Madrugada (2004) as Ruy Guerra
 Cascalho (2004)
 Luz del Fuego (1982)
 Muito Prazer (1979)
 A Noiva da Cidade (1978)

References

External links
 Ator Irving São Paulo morre aos 41 anos no Rio - in Portuguese
 

1964 births
2006 deaths
Deaths from pancreatitis
Deaths from multiple organ failure
Brazilian male film actors
Brazilian male television actors
Brazilian male telenovela actors
People from Feira de Santana